Parmouti 15 - Coptic Calendar - Parmouti 17

The sixteenth day of the Coptic month of Parmouti, the eighth month of the Coptic year. In common years, this day corresponds to April 11, of the Julian Calendar, and April 24, of the Gregorian Calendar. This day falls in the Coptic Season of Shemu, the season of the Harvest.

Commemorations

Martyrs 

 The martyrdom of Saint Antipas, Bishop of Pergamos

Other commemorations 

 The commemoration of the Righteous Enoch, being taken alive to Heaven

References 

Days of the Coptic calendar